Jin Na (born in Shanghai in 1975) is a Chinese actress and writer.

She jointly won the Best Script award at the 60th Berlin International Film Festival for the film Apart Together.

References

External links

Chinese women screenwriters
Living people
1975 births
21st-century Chinese actresses
Silver Bear for Best Screenplay winners